Elachista lomionella is a moth of the family Elachistidae that is found in Massachusetts.

The forewings are short and broad. They are mottled dark brownish grey. The hindwings and underside of the wings are dark grey.

Etymology
The species is named after Lomion, the name given to Maeglin by his mother Aredhel in Tolkien's mythology.

References

Moths described in 1997
lomionella
Endemic fauna of the United States
Moths of North America
Organisms named after Tolkien and his works